Ruislip, Northwood and Pinner is a constituency in Greater London represented in the House of Commons of the UK Parliament since 2019 by David Simmonds, a Conservative.

History
Parliament accepted the Boundary Commission's Fifth Periodic Review of Westminster constituencies and created this constituency for General Election 2010.  In this election it was won by the previous member for Ruislip, Northwood.

Predecessor seat
This seat is at its core the successor to Ruislip-Northwood which had an unbroken history as a Conservative safe seat with non-marginal majorities running from its 1950 creation. This Conservative success was only bolstered by the addition of generally highly Conservative, highly affluent Pinner in 2010.

Political history
The 2015 result was greater than the previous majority, having seen a major fall in the vote of the Liberal Democrats, of 11.7% less than national swing against the party of 15.7%, and made the seat the 57th safest of the Conservative Party's 331 seats by percentage of majority. Since 2015, the Conservative vote share has been slowly declining, while the Liberal Democrat vote share has been steadily rising.

Boundaries

Following their review of parliamentary representation in North London, the Boundary Commission for England has created a new seat of Ruislip, Northwood and Pinner to deal with population changes. It includes parts of the Harrow West constituency and much of the former Ruislip-Northwood constituency.

This constituency has electoral wards:

Eastcote and East Ruislip, Harefield, Ickenham, Northwood, Northwood Hills, West Ruislip in the London Borough of Hillingdon
Hatch End, Pinner, Pinner South in the London Borough of Harrow

The only other three-place constituency name in England is Normanton, Pontefract, and Castleford in Yorkshire.

Constituency profile
The constituency consists of Census Output Areas of two local government districts with similar characteristics: a working population whose income is higher than the national average and lower than average reliance upon social housing.  At the end of 2012 the unemployment rate in the constituency stood as 1.6% of the population claiming jobseekers allowance, compared to the regional average of 3.6%. This was the third lowest in the capital behind Richmond Park and Kingston & Surbiton.  The borough contributing to the bulk of the seat's statistics are given first.

A low for the capital 22.7/23.5% of the two boroughs' populations were without a car
19.1%/16.8 of the population without qualifications and a high 28%/36.8% at the 2011 census had a level 4 qualifications or above.

In terms of tenure 62.9%/65.2% of homes are owned outright or on a mortgage as at the 2011 census across the two London Boroughs.

Members of Parliament

Elections

Elections in the 2010s 

* Served as an MP in the 2005–2010 Parliament

See also
List of parliamentary constituencies in London

Notes

References

External links 
Politics Resources (Election results from 1922 onwards)
Electoral Calculus (Election results from 1955 onwards)

Politics of the London Borough of Hillingdon
Parliamentary constituencies in London
Constituencies of the Parliament of the United Kingdom established in 2010